Vampire Hookers is a 1978 sexploitation horror film directed by Cirio H. Santiago and written by Howard R. Cohen. An international co-production of the Philippines and the United States, the film stars John Carradine as a vampire named Richmond Reed, who recruits three female vampires who pose as prostitutes in order to lure victims to their lair. The other members of the cast include Bruce Fairbairn, Trey Wilson, Karen Stride, Lenka Novak, and Katie Dolan.

Vampire Hookers is also known by a number of other titles, including Cemetery Girls, Night of the Bloodsuckers, Sensuous Vampires, and Twice Bitten. The film has received mixed reviews from critics.

Cast
 John Carradine as Richmond Reed
 Bruce Fairbairn as Tom Buckley
 Trey Wilson as Terry Wayne
 Karen Stride as Cherish
 Lenka Novak as Suzy
 Katie Dolan as Marcy
 Lex Winter as CPO Taylor
 Leo Martinez as Julio
 Vic Diaz as Pavo

Production
Vampire Hookers was filmed in Manila, Philippines in 16 mm.

Critical reception
Paula Mejia of Newsweek included Vampire Hookers on a list of ten "excellent cheesy horror movies", and wrote that "the one-liners are atrocious, as is the movie's cringeworthy theme song". In his book Vampire Films of the 1970s: Dracula to Blacula and Every Fang Between, writer Gary A. Smith also noted the film's use of one-liners, writing that they "seem positively brilliant when compared with the fart humor which abounds." Smith wrote that the film "defines the term 'grindhouse cinema, and goes on to call it "poorly photographed in 16mm complete with the harsh lighting, post-synched dialogue and generally wretched performances so prevalent in '70s exploitation movies."

Home media
In September 2013, Vampire Hookers was released on DVD by Vinegar Syndrome as a double feature with the 1978 film Death Force, which was also directed by Santiago. In August 2018, Vinegar Syndrome released the film on Blu-ray as part of their 5 Films 5 Years Volume #4 set, a release which also contains four other films. Squanch Games licensed the film to be used in their 2022 video game High On Life.

References

External links
 
 

1970s exploitation films
1978 horror films
1978 films
American exploitation films
American sexploitation films
Films about Filipino Americans
Films about prostitution in the Philippines
Films shot in Manila
Philippine erotic horror films
American vampire films
1970s English-language films
Films directed by Cirio H. Santiago
1970s American films